Kolding FC was a Danish football club based in Kolding, a merger of two older football clubs. On 11 November 2006, the club received permission from the Danish FA to sign contracts. Before that, the club was the highest ranked amateur club in Denmark. In 2011 Kolding FC merged with Vejle Boldklub, but the merger came to an end again in 2013, without Kolding FC being reestablished.

History 

KFC's relatively short history started with a merger between the two oldest football clubs from Kolding, Kolding IF and Kolding Boldklub, which was put into effect on 1 January 2002 after a period of intense negotiations.

In 2002–03, their first complete season as Kolding FC, the club, that had just been relegated from the 1. Division, finished the season in the middle of the table in the 2. Division, placed ninth among sixteen teams. In 2003–04, the team was just one point away from promotion back to the 1. Division, but missed the opportunity after losing to Dalum and Næstved.

Finally, in 2004–05, the club topped the 2. Division, with an impressive 23 wins, 7 losses, no ties, and gained promotion back into 1. Division.

In the winter break in the 2005–06-season, the team was 3rd, and had greatly exceeded their own expectations of reaching the top 11. They needed just 2 points to reach the 2nd place, which granted promotion to the Superliga. However, the team did not make it. Five matches before the season ending, the expectations were adjusted to the top-5, but four losses and a tie destroyed that. The team ended 6th, after a very unstable summer-season.

Nike sponsorship 
On 6 March 2007, the club announced that Nike was to give a five-year sponsorship to KFC. The chairman, Jens Haugaard, called the deal "extremely big for a 1st division club". The sponsorship has been said to be worth "more than DKK 3 million" and "DKK 5 million". The deal consists of the following components:
All clothing for all teams in the club and for the mother clubs, Kolding IF and Kolding Boldklub, training and match kits
An undisclosed amount of money
A yearly friendly match facing the highest ranking other Danish Nike-sponsored team (currently Odense Boldklub)
The other way round, KFC must be available for a yearly match with a lower ranking Nike-team

Stadium 

Kolding FC currently play their home matches on Kolding Stadion, built in 1931. A modernization of the stadium has been done, including a VIP section, but further efforts have been halted because of the municipality not allowing it. Therefore, a new stadium is planned, either near the sports centre Kolding Hallen or near the planned site for the new Kolding Superdome.

Colours and badge

Until 2005–06 
The round logo was introduced at the club's foundation in 2002. The eagle was also pictured – in a larger format – on the shirts of the club at that time. This logo was designed by a local advertising agency, Schultz & Sørensen.

Current logo 
The current logo has a more badge-like shape than the previous one. With the logo change came new jerseys as well – the classic Kolding blue/white-uniform was traded for a more distinctive maroon/black approach.

With the 2007 Nike sponsorship, the shorts' colour was switched to white.

Supporters 
KFC's official fan club is called Kolding FC Support.

In terms of support, the club faces competition from the local handball-club, KIF Kolding, who have been in the top of Danish handball for several years.

Season-by-season results 

Green denotes promotion, red denotes relegation.

See also 
Kolding IF
Kolding Boldklub
Fionia Bank Cup

References

External links 
  Kolding FC – official webpage
  Kolding FC Support – official fanclub's webpage
 The 2005 Kolding FC team at eufo.de

Football clubs in Denmark
Kolding
Association football clubs established in 2002
2002 establishments in Denmark
Defunct football clubs in Denmark